Max Murphy may refer to:

Max Murphy, founder of Presentation College, Chaguanas
Max Murphy, singer on The Voice UK (series 3)
Max Murphy (bassist) in Mutant Press